This is a list of the Ministers General of the Order of the Most Holy Trinity for the Redemption of the Captives.

Ministers General up to 1598 
 John de Matha, 1198 - 1213
 John the Englishman, 1214 - 1217
 William the Scot, 1217 - 1222
 Roger of Champagne, 1223 - 1227
 Michael the Spaniard, 1227 - 1230
 Nicolas, 1231 - 1257
 James of Flanders, 1257 - 1262
 Alard, 1262 - 1272
 Jean Boileau, 1272 - 1291
 Pierre de Cuisy, 1291 - 1315
 Bertraud, 1315 - 1324
 Jean Brunet, 1324 - 1337
 Thomas Loquet, 1337 - 1357
 Pedro de Bourry, 1357 - 1373
 Jean de La Marche, 1374 - 1392
 Renaud de La Marche, 1392 - 1410
 Thierry de Vareland, 1410 - 1413
 Étienne Mesnil-Fouchard, 1414 - 1415
 Pierre Chandoté, 1415 - 1420
 Jean Halboud de Troyes, 1421 - 1439
 Jean Thibaut, 1440 - 1460
 Raul Duvivier, 1460 - 1472
 Robert Gaguin, 1473 - 1501
 Guy Musnier, 1502 - 1508
 Nicholas Musnier, 1509 - 1545
 Thierry Musnier, 1546 - 1568
 Bernard of Metz or Dominici, 1570 - 1597
 François Petit, 1598 - 1612

Ministers General of the Calced Trinitarians 
 Louis Petit, 1612 - 1652
 Claude Ralle, 1652 - 1654
 Pierre Mercier, 1655 - 1683

For France
 Eustache Teissier, 1686 - 1693 Not confirmed by Innocent XI
 Grégoire de la Forge, 1693 - 1704

For the provinces outside France
 Antonio Pegueroles, 1688 - 1696
 José of Toledo, 1696 - 1700

For the entire Order
 Grégoire de La Forge, 1704 - 1706
 Claude Massac, 1706 - 1716  and 1716 - 1748
 Guillaume Lefèvre, 1749 - 1764
 François Pichault, 1765 - 1780
 Pierre Chauvier, 1781 - 1792
 Vacancy (1792-1805)
 Silvestre Calvo, 1805 - 1813
 Blas Sánchez, 1814 - 1824 (Vicar General)
 Pablo Hernández, 1825 - 1826
 Francisco Javier León, 1826 - 1831 (Vicar General)
 Francisco Martí, 1831 - 1853
 Segismundo Casas, 1853 - 05/11/1855 (Apostolic Commmissary)
 Antonio Martín Bienes, 1856 - 1894 (Apostolic Commissary)

Ministers General of the Discalced  Trinitarians 
 Gabriel of the Assumption, 1631 - 1632
 Francisco of the Cross, 1632
 Isidoro of the St. John, 1632-1635 (Vicar General) 1635 - 1641 (Minister General)
 Diego of Jesus, 1641 - 1647
 Martín of the Assumption, 1647 - 1653
 Gaspar of Jesus, 06/05/1653 - 1656
 Diego of the Mother of God, 1656
 Leandro of the Bl. Sacrament, 1656 - 1662
 Francisco of the St. Julian, 1662 - 1663
 Pedro of the Ascension, 1663 (Vicar General) 1665 - 1671 (Minister General)
 Antonio of the Conception, 1671 - 1677
 Antonio of the Holy Spirit, 1677 - 1678
 Miguel of the Jesus and Mary, 1678 - 1680 (Vicar General)
 Antonio of the Conception, 1680 - 1685
 Pedro of the St. Michael, 1685 - 1686 (Vicar General) 1686 - 1692 (Minister General)
 Rafael of St. John, 1692 - 1693
 Juan of St. Anthony, 1693 - 1695 (Vicar General) 1695 - 1701 (Minister General)
 Juan of St. Athanasius, 1701 - 1707
 Juan of St. Paul, 1707 - 1716
 Alejandro of the Conception, 1716 - 1739
 Miguel of St. Francis, 1739 - 1740 (Vicar General)
 José of the Ascension, 1740 - 1747
 Miguel of St. St. Joseph, 1747 - 1750
 Rodrigo of St. Laureano, 1750 - 1753 (Vicario General)
 Stanislaw of the Bl. Sacrament, 1753 - 1759
 Gaspar of. St. Thomas Aquinas, 1759 - 1763
 Francisco of St. Albert, 1763 - 1765 (Vicar General)
 Rudolf of St. John Nepucene, 1765 - 1771
 Gudisalvo of the Nativity, 1771 - 1776
 Francisco of St. Michael, 1776 - 1778 (Vicar General)
 Leo of the Ascension, 1778 - 1783
In 1783 the general administration of the Order was divided between a Minister General for Spain and Vicar General or second Minister General for the rest of the Order.
 José of the Ascension, 1783 - 1785
 José of St. John Baptist, 1785 - 1789 (Vicar General)
 Juan of Our Lady of Mt. Carmel, 1789 - 1795
 Blas of St. Michael, 1795 - 1801
 Isidoro of St. Vincent, 1801 - 1807
 Juan of the Nativity, 1807 - 1808
 José of St. Rafael, 1808 - 1818 (Vicar General)
 Jerónimo of St. Felix, 1818 - 1824
 Luis of the Assumption, 1824 - 1827 (Vicar General)
 Ignacio of St. Joseph, 1827 - 1830 (Vicar General)
 Antonio of Bl. Michael of the Saints, 1830 - 1840
 Juan of the Visitation, 1841 - 1850 (Apostolic Commissary)
 José of the Trinity, 1851 - 1860 (Apostolic Commissary)
 Jorge of the Virgin, 1860 - 1879 (Apostolic Commissary)
 Bernardino of Bl. Sacrament, 1879 - 1895 (Apostolic Commissary)
 Esteban of the Imm. Heart of Mary, 1895 - 1897 (Apostolic Commissary); 1897 - 1900 (Minister General)
 Gregorio of Jesus and Mary, 1900 - 1906
 Antonino of the Assumption, 1906 - 1919 and 1931 - 1943
 Xavier of the Immaculate Conception, 1919 - 1931
 Ignazio of the Bl. Sacrament, 1943 - 1947 and 1947 - 1959
 Michele of Jesus, 1959 - 1971
 Ignacio Vizcargüénaga Arriortua, 1971 - 1977 and 1977 - 1983

Ministers General after 1983 
 José Gamarra Mayor, 1983 - 1989 and 1989 - 1995
 José Hernández Sánchez, 1995 - 2001 and 2001 - 2007
 Jose Narlaly, 2007 - 2013 and 2013 -

References

Sources

Trinitarians
Trinitarians

Lists of Christian religious leaders